The Information Services Department (ISD) is the Hong Kong Government's public relations office, publisher, advertiser, and news agency, serving as the link between the government and the media. It was also commonly called Government Information Services (GIS).

History
In September 1945, following the end of the Japanese occupation, the British Forces appointed a Press Relations Officer to communicate with remaining war correspondents. The unit was retitled as the Public Relations Office (PRO) when the civilian administration resumed governance of Hong Kong in 1946. The PRO was renamed as the Information Services Department (ISD) on 1 April 1959.

On 8 June 1963, ISD's headquarters moved from the fifth and sixth floors of the West Wing of the Central Government Offices to the top two floors of the new Beaconsfield House on Queen's Road Central.

In the 1970s, ISD launched new social development campaigns that are now ingrained in the collective memory of Hong Kong people. These included the Keep Hong Kong Clean Campaign, which was promoted using the iconic Lap Sap Chung litterbug character designed by ISD officer Arthur Hacker.

Following the 1995 sale of Beaconsfield House to a private developer, the Information Services Department relocated to the nearby Murray Building in 1996. Today, it is headquartered at the Harbour Building in Sheung Wan. It also once had offices in the Former French Mission Building.

In July 2022, the department rejected an Access to Information request after some media outlets were banned from covering events regarding 25th anniversary events on 1 July 2022. In response, the Ombudsman confirmed that there would be a full investigation into the matter. In January 2023, the Ombudsman agreed with the ISD, and said that revealing the method to screen journalists could aid "terrorists."

In September 2022, Fletch Chan, head of the department, was part of a team that organized of a media event with John Lee. When Hong Kong Free Press (HKFP) asked the ISD about why they could not attend, the ISD told HKFP to contact the event organizer.

Organisation 
The department is organised into four divisions:
Local Public Relations
Publicity and Promotions
Public Relations Outside Hong Kong
Administration

Directors

References

Bibliography

External links 
 

1959 establishments in Hong Kong
Hong Kong government departments and agencies